El Clasico Capitalino (Capital derby), refers to football matches between América and UNAM, both from Mexico City.

Background
In México the match is often perceived as the representation of a struggle between two antagonistic powers and institutions: Club América has always been regarded as the club of the establishment and the wealthy. The fact that the club is owned by the multimedia mass media company Televisa has further intensified this image. UNAM, representing the Universidad Nacional Autónoma de México, identifies itself as the club of the intellectuals and middle-class.

Indeed, both are clubs with very contrasting identities and policy, Club Universidad Nacional was originally an amateur club of college students from the University's several schools and then developed into a professional team competing in the Mexican football league, the nickname Pumas "Cougars" was inspired by Roberto 'Tapatio' Mendez, who coached the team from 1946–64 and whose motivational speeches often compared his players to pumas. The nickname stayed with the public, and all the athletic teams representing the University have been called Pumas; Club América self-proclaimed Las Águilas "The Eagles" wanted to have a representation of an animal that would show pride and domination of its environment. However, they are also called Los millonetas, a derogatory reference or version of the word millionaire, started when businessman Emilio Azcarraga Milmo, owner of Telesistema Mexicano, bought América from Isaac Bessudo in 1959. Following the acquisition, Azcárraga told his players, "I do not know much about football, but I do know a lot about business, and this, gentlemen, will be a business".

Azcarraga hired the successful president of the Club Zacatepec, Guillermo Cañedo de la Bárcena, and started to hire other notable national and foreigner figures, focusing on money, to form a powerful team, Universidad Nacional instead have employed "La cantera universitaria", a  youth development system with football academies and farm teams to success through its history.

The rivalry is particularly fierce from UNAM's side: according to surveys the majority of their supporters consider América as their main rival, however, most of América's fans see it as an important match but deem the match against Chivas as more important.

History and rivalry

During the 1961–62 season in the Segunda División de México, UNAM were able to get promotion into top flight football, the Primera División de México. The first match for the team "benjamín" (newbie) of that season was América meeting on 1 July 1962 where América won 2–0  with goals by Francisco Moacyr and Antonio Jasso.

For the 1966–67 season, América, Atlante and Necaxa moved to a new stadium, the Estadio Azteca, and the first meeting between América  and UNAM on 19 August 1966, América won 5–1. This defeat really hurt the pride of the fans "Universitarios" and playing at home on 1 December 1966, UNAM defeated América 4–1 in the Estadio Olímpico.

Years later, in the 1969–70 season, América were able to get international forward Enrique Borja, news which caused a lot of controversy and shocked the football world due to the strong rivalry between the teams. This transaction caused such an outrage that when the player found out of the transfer he opted not to play because he did not agree. However, the directors of the club were able to convince him and would play and later become an idol for América .

The rivalry increased with the years and came at a high point during the 1980s when these clubs disputed three finals during that decade. The first final was during the season 1984–85 which after 2 games tied, they had to play a third match on 28 May 1985 which caused great controversy of the performance of the referee Joaquín Urrea, the final score was 3–1 in favor of las Águilas with two goals by Daniel Brailovsky and one by Carlos Hermosillo, with this victory América was able to obtain their 5th title. They again met each other in the final during the season 1987–88 where once again América was victorious witch a favorable score of 4–1 during the second leg on 3 July 1988 and an aggregate score of 4–2. The last final disputed among the clubs was during the season 1990–91 in which UNAM was finally able to break its losing streak against América. The first game was won by América at home 3–2 on 19 July 1991 and the second leg on 22 July 1991 the game was decided by a free kick which was taken by Brazilian Ricardo "Tuca" Ferretti, this signified the third title in the history for the club "auriazul".

Records

All-time goalscorers

All-time most appearances

Statistics
Statistics are correct as of 2 May 2021.

1 Includes liguilla matches.

Honours

Results

References

External links 
 Sitio web oficial Club América 
 Sitio web oficial Club Universidad Nacional

Football rivalries in Mexico
Club América
Club Universidad Nacional
1962 establishments in Mexico